The Most Illustrious Order of Paduka Laila Jasa Keberanian Gemilang, also translated as The Most Illustrious Order of Splendid Valour, is an order of Brunei. It was established on 1 August 1968 by Sultan Hassanal Bolkiah.

The order consists of three classes:

References 

Orders, decorations, and medals of Brunei
Awards established in 1968
1968 establishments in Brunei